Miss United States 1961, also referred to as Miss World USA 1961, was the 4th edition of the Miss United States World pageant. It was held at Carnegie Hall in New York City, New York, and was won by Jo Ann Odum of West Virginia. Odum was crowned by outgoing titleholder, Judith Ann Achter of Missouri. Odum went on to represent the United States at the Miss World 1961 Pageant in London later that year. She finished in the Top 7 at Miss World.

Results

Placements

Special awards

Delegates
The Miss United States World 1961 delegates were:

 Atlantic City, NJ - Lonnie Bell
 California - Marlena Loren
 Connecticut - Jayne Burghardt
 Delaware - Alicia Silver
 District of Columbia - Patricia "Patti" Alice Buck
 Florida - Lynne Shirley
 Georgia - Sandra New
 Idaho - Marva Jean Rich
 Kentucky - Louise King
 Louisville, KY - Martha Shipp
 Maine - Jennifer Farrell
 Maryland - Diane Dolores White
 Massachusetts - Sandra "Su Su" Smith
 Michigan - Mikki Catsman
 Mississippi - Diane Carpenter 
 Missouri - Barbara Kohler
 New Jersey - Ione Williams
 New York - Janet Boring
 New York City, NY - Marilyn Chase
 North Carolina - Betsy Medlin
 Ohio - Judith Kay Tewalt
 Oregon - Sharon Wiley
 Pennsylvania - Marcia Freedman
 Philadelphia, PA - Mary Lee Winton
 Rhode Island - Paula Holmes
 South Carolina - Judy Austin
 Spartanburg, SC - Rita Souther
 Tennessee - Christine McSwain
 Texas - Cheryl Stubblefield
 Vermont - Florene Mayette 
 Virginia - Laurie Mills
 West Virginia - Jo Ann Odum
 Wisconsin - Judith Greco

Notes

Did not Compete

Crossovers
Contestants who competed in other beauty pageants:

Miss USA
1959: : Jayne Burghardt
1959: : Diane Dolores White (Top 15)
1960: : Christine McSwain
1961: : Florene Mayette (Top 15; as )
1963: : Sandra "Su Su" Smith (Top 15)

References

External links
Miss World Official Website
Miss World America Official Website

1961 in the United States
World America
1961
1961 in New York City
Carnegie Hall